In rail technology attack angle means an angle generated between the direction of the wheel set and the direction of the wheel set traveling direction in a curved section or the like.  γ in the figure on the right is the attack angle. If the attack angle is not 0, a force that pushes the wheel against the rail is generated, which may cause derailment.  Also, due to the wheel skidding with respect to the rail, wear on the tread and rail of the wheel increases. Further, when the attack angle is large, the flange comes into contact with the side surface of the rail, which is one of the causes of squeaking noise and increases wear. An oiling device may be installed on the vehicle or track side for the purpose of reducing wear in curved sections caused by attack angles, etc.  Various self-steering bogies have been developed for the purpose of reducing the attack angle.

See also 
Nadal formula
Arnoux system
Bogie#Cleminson system
Scheffel bogie
Talgo
Tokyo Metro 2000 series
KiHa 283 series
383 series
GE AC4400CW (Customers can choose radial steering trucks)

References 

rail technologies